The following highways are numbered 573:

United States